Dimane (or Diman) is a mountainous village in the Bsharri District, in the North Governorate of Lebanon. It sits at approximately 1400m above sea level, overlooking the Kadisha Valley.

The inhabitants of Dimane are Lebanese and are followers of the Maronite Catholic Church. Its patron saint is Saint Joseph and his feast day is celebrated on 19 March each year.

Summer Patriarchal residence
The village is well known as the summer residence of the Maronite Patriarch, currently Mar Béchara Pierre Raï.  The foundation stone for the current Patriarchal residence was laid on 28 September 1899.

Key sites
Dimane is also known for the "Garden of the Patriarchs", located in the west end of the village, and for the ancient footpath which starts behind the village's parish church, Saint John Maroun, and leads to the bottom of the Kadisha Valley where the Maronites headed by their Patriarch took refuge for centuries after the Arab Muslim invasions in the seventh century.

Families
Families of Dimane include Ghosn, Assaf, Francis, Jabbour, Laba, Basil, Moussa, Yacoub, Arab, Daher, Harb, Metlege, Ramia, Daaboul, Saleh, Bazouni, Zeaiter, Abboud, Alphonse, and Saab.

Photo gallery

Populated places in the North Governorate
Bsharri District
Maronite Christian communities in Lebanon